Mike Epps: Only One Mike is a 2019 Netflix stand-up comedy special by American comic Mike Epps, directed by Kevin Bray. It is Epps' second Netflix stand-up special, following Mike Epps: Don't Take it Personal (2015).

The special was filmed on November 3, 2018, at DAR Constitution Hall in Washington, D.C. Epps discusses sexual misconduct, special education and aging. It was released on June 25, 2019, on Netflix streaming.

References

External links
 
 
 

2019 films
2019 comedy films
2010s English-language films
Films directed by Kevin Bray (director)
Films shot in Washington, D.C.
Netflix specials
Stand-up comedy concert films